is a 2011 Japanese film directed by Isamu Nakae and was scheduled to be released in Japanese cinemas on 23 July 2011. It is based on a true story from the small island of Miyakejima.

Cast
 Ryuta Sato 
 Kumiko Asō
 Yoshinori Okada
 Shuuji Kashiwabara
 Koki Sahara
 Taiki Nakahayashi
 Jiro Sato
 Ken Mitsuishi
 Hitomi Satō
 Okayamahajime
 Shisho Nakamaru
 Mieko Harada
 Mitsuko Baisho
 Karen Miyama

Filming

Post Production
This film's official trailer was first uploaded to this film's official page on April 16, 2011.

References

External links
  
 

2010s Japanese-language films
2010s Japanese films